UFC Fight Night: Cyborg vs. Länsberg (also known as UFC Fight Night 95) was a mixed martial arts event produced by the Ultimate Fighting Championship held on September 24, 2016, at Ginásio Nilson Nelson in Brasília, Brazil.

Background
The event in Brasília was the second that the organization hosted in the Brazilian capital city, with the first being UFC Fight Night: Bigfoot vs. Arlovski in September 2014.

The event was headlined by a catchweight bout of 140 lb between former Strikeforce Women's Featherweight Champion and current Invicta FC Featherweight Champion Cris Cyborg and promotional newcomer Lina Länsberg.

On August 13, the card suffered multiple changes due to injury: Brandon Thatch and Shinsho Anzai pulled out of their respective fights against Erick Silva and Luan Chagas. Silva and Chagas were instead rescheduled to face each other. Renato Moicano and Joaquim Silva also pulled out of their respective fights against Mike De La Torre and promotional newcomer Gregor Gillespie. Their replacements were Godofredo Pepey and The Ultimate Fighter: Brazil 4 winner Glaico França, respectively.

At the weigh-ins, Michel Prazeres missed weight by two pounds, weighing in at 158 lb. As a result, he was fined 20% of his fight purse, which went to Gilbert Burns.

Results

Bonus awards
The following fighters were awarded $50,000 bonuses:
Fight of the Night: Erick Silva vs. Luan Chagas
Performance of the Night: Eric Spicely and Vicente Luque

See also
List of UFC events
2016 in UFC

References

UFC Fight Night
Mixed martial arts in Brazil
Sport in Brasília
2016 in mixed martial arts
2016 in Brazilian sport
September 2016 sports events in South America